Gerald Geraghty (August 10, 1906 – July 8, 1954) was an American screenwriter, mostly of Westerns.

Early life and family
Geraghty was born in Rushville, Indiana. His father was screenwriter Tom Geraghty. His brother Maurice was also a screenwriter; and his sister was silent film actress and painter Carmelita Geraghty. Geraghty and his family moved to Hollywood when he was young. He was a graduate of Hollywood High School and Princeton University.

Career 
Before he wrote for films, Geraghty wrote stories for magazines. Geraghty first worked with films as a writer of subtitles for the silent version of Street of Chance (1930).

Geraghty also wrote Gene Autry Rides, a Sunday newspaper comic strip that began in 1940 and ended in 1942.

Personal life 
Geraghty was married to the former Gretchen Darling, and they had a daughter, Erin. They were divorced on December 1, 1949. When he died, his wife was named Marcia, and he also had a son,

He died from a cerebral haemorrhage.

Partial filmography

 Under the Tonto Rim (1933)
 Sunset Pass (1933)
 The Scoop (1934)
 Bar 20 Rides Again (1935)
 The Miracle Rider (1935)
 The Jungle Princess (1936) 
 Wells Fargo (1937)
 Come On, Rangers (1938)
 Western Jamboree (1938)
 Southward Ho (1939)
 Mexicali Rose (1939)
 Blue Montana Skies (1939)
 In Old Caliente (1939)
 Mountain Rhythm (1939)
 Wall Street Cowboy (1939)
 In Old Monterey (1939)
 The Arizona Kid (1939)
 South of the Border (1939)
 Pioneers of the West (1940)
 Young Buffalo Bill (1940)
 Hidden Gold (1940)
 The Carson City Kid (1940)
 The Ranger and the Lady (1940)
 King of Dodge City (1941)
 Badlands of Dakota (1941)
 South of Tahiti (1941)
 Secret of the Wastelands (1941)
 Sunset on the Desert (1942)
 Sin Town (1942)
 Riding Through Nevada (1942)
 Hoppy Serves a Writ (1943)
 The Falcon Strikes Back (1943)
 Frontier Badmen (1943)
 Hail to the Rangers (1943)
 The Falcon and the Co-eds (1943)
 The Falcon in Hollywood (1944)
 Frisco Sal (1945)
 Shady Lady (1945)
 Along the Navajo Trail (1945)
 Rainbow Over Texas (1946)
 Apache Rose (1947)
 Wyoming (1947)
 Train to Alcatraz (1948)
 The Plunderers (1948)
 Grand Canyon Trail (1948)
 The Red Menace (1949)
 Riders in the Sky (1949)
 Mule Train (1950)
 Cow Town (1950)
 Trigger, Jr. (1950)
 Sunset in the West (1950)
 Trail of Robin Hood (1950)
 Silver Canyon (1951)
 The Hills of Utah (1951)
 Valley of Fire (1951)
 The Old West (1952)
 Barbed Wire (1952)
 Wagon Team (1952)
 Blue Canadian Rockies (1952)
 On Top of Old Smoky (1953)
 Iron Mountain Trail (1953)
 Savage Frontier (1953)
 Goldtown Ghost Riders (1953)
 Down Laredo Way (1953)
 Bandits of the West (1953)
 Shadows of Tombstone (1953)
 Red River Shore (1953)
 Phantom Stallion (1954)

References

External links 
 

American male screenwriters
1906 births
1954 deaths
People from Rushville, Indiana
Screenwriters from Indiana
20th-century American male writers
20th-century American screenwriters